A system on a module (SoM) is a board-level circuit that integrates a system function in a single module. It may integrate digital and analog functions on a single board.  A typical application is in the area of embedded systems. Unlike a single-board computer, a SoM serves a special function like a system on a chip (SoC). The devices integrated in the SoM typically requires a high level of interconnection for reasons such as speed, timing, bus width etc.. There are benefits in building a SoM, as for SoC; one notable result is to reduce the cost of the base board or the main PCB.  Two other major advantages of SoMs are design-reuse and that they can be integrated into many embedded computer applications.

History 

The acronym SoM has its roots in the blade-based modules. In the mid 1980s, when VMEbus blades used M-Modules, these were commonly referred to as system On a module (SoM). These SoMs performed specific functions such as compute functions and data acquisition functions. SoMs were used extensively by Sun Microsystems, Motorola, Xerox, DEC, and IBM in their blade computers.

Design 

A typical SoM consists of:

 at least one microcontroller, microprocessor or digital signal processor (DSP) core
multiprocessor systems-on-chip (MPSoCs) have more than one processor core
 memory blocks including a selection of ROM, RAM, EEPROM and/or flash memory
 timing sources 
 industry standard communication interfaces such as USB, FireWire, Ethernet, USART, SPI, I²C
 peripherals including counter-timers, real-time timers and power-on reset generators
 analog interfaces including analog-to-digital converters and digital-to-analog converters
 voltage regulators and power management circuits

See also

References 

 ANSI/IEEE Std 1014-1987 and ANSI/VITA 1-1994
  1386-2001 - IEEE Standard for a Common Mezzanine Card Family: CMC
 Standard ANSI/VITA 46.0-2007
 VITA Technologies Hall of Fame - PCI Mezzanine Cards

Microcomputers
Embedded systems
Computer buses
IEEE standards